This is a list of former Footlights members who have achieved notability after graduating from the University of Cambridge. The careers of many prominent figures in the world of entertainment began in Footlights, while prominent figures in other industries also took part in Footlights. They include:

References

External links
 Official website
 Footlights Alumni Association

Footlights